Police Lockup is a 1992 Indian Kannada-language film,  directed by  K. V. Raju and produced by M. Rajendra and N. Kumar. The film stars Arjun Sarja, Thiagarajan, Kavya, and Vinaya Prasad. The film has a musical score by V. Manohar.

Cast

Arjun Sarja
Thiagarajan
Kavya
Vinaya Prasad
Doddanna
Lohithaswa
Avinash
Ashok Rao
Tennis Krishna
Sathyajith
Dombara Krishna Suresh 
Jolly Bastin

Soundtrack

Kannada Version 

The soundtrack was composed and lyrics were written by V. Manohar.

Telugu Version (Gharana Inspector) 

The film was dubbed into Telugu as Gharana Inspector. The soundtrack was composed by V. Manohar and all lyrics were written by Rajasri.

References

External links
 

1992 films
1990s Kannada-language films
1990s police procedural films
Indian action films
1992 action films
Films scored by V. Manohar